Samuel Vernon Stewart (August 2, 1872 – September 15, 1939) was an American attorney and Democratic Party politician, an attorney, former Montana Supreme Court Justice and the sixth Governor of Montana.

Biography
Stewart was born in Monroe County, Ohio, attended Kansas State Normal School, and earned a law degree from the University of Kansas in 1898. He married Stella Baker and they had three daughters.

Career
Stewart practiced law in Virginia City, Montana, where he served as city attorney and county attorney for Madison County, Montana. He was chosen as chairman of the Montana Democratic Party in 1910, serving for two years. He was a delegate to the Democratic National Convention in 1916, 1920, and 1924.

Stewart was elected Governor of Montana in 1912 and was re-elected in 1916, serving two terms from 1913 to 1921. It was under his governing that Jeannette Rankin became the first female Congress member. During his tenure, a fish and game law was sanctioned, a council of defense was authorized, a state highway commission was organized, a sedition act was passed, World War I issues were dealt with, and two additional justices were added to the state supreme court.

After leaving the office of Governor, Stewart returned to his law practice with the firm of John Griest Brown and served as city attorney of Helena. He challenged incumbent United States Senator Burton K. Wheeler in the Democratic primary in 1928, but lost to Wheeler in a landslide. He was elected to one term in the Montana House of Representatives (1930–32). In 1932, Stewart was appointed to the Montana Supreme Court, where he served until his death in 1939. While serving on the Supreme Court, he ran for the United States Senate once again in 1936, this time challenging incumbent Senator James E. Murray in the Democratic primary. However, he trailed far behind Murray, who narrowly won renomination against Congressman Joseph P. Monaghan.

Death
Stewart died on September 15, 1939, and is interred at Forestvale Cemetery, Helena, Lewis and Clark County, Montana.

References

External links
 State of Montana profile
National Governors Association biography
The Encyclopedia of Montana

1872 births
1939 deaths
People from Woodsfield, Ohio
Emporia State University alumni
University of Kansas alumni
Montana lawyers
Democratic Party governors of Montana
Democratic Party members of the Montana House of Representatives
Justices of the Montana Supreme Court
American Presbyterians